Itapetinga, Bahia, Brazil is a municipality in the state of Bahia in the North-East region of Brazil. Its population in 2020, according to estimates by the IBGE, was 76,795, so it is the 24th most populous municipality of Bahia.

Sister cities

  Cerritos, California, United States

See also
List of municipalities in Bahia

External links
Map of Itapetinga (Mapa de Itapetinga, in Portuguese) Up to now (June 2011) the only georeferenced street map with confirmed street names for this municipality.

References

Municipalities in Bahia